The Borough of East Yorkshire was one of nine local government districts of the county of Humberside, England from 1 April 1974 to 1 April 1996.

The district was created as North Wolds, but was renamed by resolution of the council on 1 February 1981 (the Borough of Beverley was renamed to include 'East Yorkshire' in its name the same year).  The council had made an earlier attempt, before it formally came into existence, to be named "Bridlington and Yorkshire Wolds".

The district was formed under the Local Government Act 1972 by the amalgamation of a number of areas formerly in the administrative county of Yorkshire, East Riding, namely: the municipal borough of Bridlington, Driffield urban district, Driffield Rural District, Pocklington Rural District and most of Bridlington Rural District.

The district was abolished in 1996 and merged into the new East Riding of Yorkshire local government district, which covers a much larger area.

References

History of the East Riding of Yorkshire
Former non-metropolitan districts of Humberside
Former boroughs in England